Connor Collett (born 05 February 1996) is an English rugby union player who plays for Newcastle Falcons in the Premiership Rugby.

References

External links
Newcastle Falcons Profile
ESPN Profile
Ultimate Rugby Profile

1996 births
Living people
English rugby union players
Newcastle Falcons players
Rugby union players from Huntingdon
Rugby union flankers
People educated at Stamford School